Mycobacterium porcinum is a species of Mycobacterium.

References

External links
Type strain of Mycobacterium porcinum at BacDive -  the Bacterial Diversity Metadatabase

Acid-fast bacilli
porcinum